WSD may refer to:

Education 

 Wanganui School of Design
 Windham School District (Texas), US
 Wisconsin School for the Deaf, US
 Westminster School District, Orange County, California, US
 Woodbridge School District

Observances 
 World Speech Day
 World Statistics Day
 World Storytelling Day
 World Stroke Day

Other uses 
 Water Supplies Department, of the government of Hong Kong
 Web Services for Devices, a Microsoft API
 Wideband Single-bit Data, a file format for Direct Stream Digital encoded audio recordings
 Word-sense disambiguation, in natural language processing